The 2000 Goody's Body Pain 500 was a NASCAR Winston Cup Series stock car race held on April 9, 2000 at the Martinsville Speedway in Martinsville, Virginia.  Mark Martin of Roush Racing won the race, his first and only win of the 2000 season. Jeff Burton finished second and Michael Waltrip finished third.

Background 
The Martinsville Speedway is a 0.526-mile paperclip-shaped oval built in 1947, the shortest in the NASCAR Cup Series schedule.  The straights are 800 feet in length and the turns are 588 feet in length.  The turns are banked at 12 degrees.  The corners are paved with concrete to help with acceleration and traction out of the tight turns while the rest of the track is paved with asphalt.  It has held NASCAR Cup races every year since 1949.  The race is at a distance of 263 miles, or 500 laps.

Coming into the race, there were seven different winners in seven races to begin the 2000 season.  The streak continued to eight as Mark Martin became the eight straight different winner.  This was the first race after the death of the Petty family patriarch, Lee Petty.  This comes less than a week after Adam Petty, the fourth-generation Petty, made his one and only Cup start the previous week at Texas.  Adam would pass away in a practice crash at New Hampshire International Speedway a month later on what would be a very tragic year for the Petty family.  Starting at this race, NASCAR instituted a new pit road rule where tires are now required to be moved to the left side of the pit box instead of being left on the right side of the pit box.  Pit crew injuries and damaged race cars at the beginning of the season implored NASCAR to make the rule change.  This bit Ward Burton and Jeff Gordon during the race as they were penalized for leaving their tires on the right side of the pit box when making right side tire changes.

After a lackluster beginning of the season, Eel River Racing replaced Jeff Fuller with Mike Bliss in the #27 Viagra Pontiac starting with this race. He would stay in that ride until the end of the 2000 season.

Failed to qualify:  Wally Dallenbach (#75), Rick Mast (#14), Dave Marcis (#71), Ed Berrier (#90)

Top 10 Results

Post-Race Championship Standings

References 

2000 NASCAR Winston Cup Series
NASCAR races at Martinsville Speedway
2000 in sports in Virginia